Sir Toaripi Lauti  (28 November 1928 – 25 May 2014) was a Tuvaluan politician who served as chief minister of the Colony of Tuvalu (1975–78), as the first prime minister following Tuvalu's independence (1978–1981) and governor-general of Tuvalu (1990–1993). He was married to Sualua Tui.

Education

Lauti was born in Toaripi village of the Territory of Papua. His father was Pastor Lauti Kae of Funafuti. He studied at Elisefou (New Ellice) primary school in Vaitupu for 6 years from 1938 to 1944. In 1945, he was sent to study in Fiji at the Londoni Provincial School, and in 1946 at the Queen Victoria School, before moving in 1947 to Wesley College in Auckland, New Zealand. From 1948 to 1951, he finished his schooling at St Andrews College in Christchurch in 1948. He attended the Teachers' Training College in Christchurch in 1952 and 1953, at the same time he was a House Master at St Andrew's College.

Pre-Independence career

Toaripi Lauti was a teacher at King George V Secondary School in Tarawa from 1954 to 1962. From 1962 to 1974 he was an industrial relations officer with the British Phosphate Commissioners in Nauru. In 1974, he entered politics and became a member of the House of Assembly for the constituency of Funafuti of the Gilbert and Ellice Islands, as leader of the Opposition.

He was the first chief minister of the Colony of Tuvalu, the former Ellice Islands, from 2 October 1975 to 1 October 1978.

Prime Minister of Tuvalu, post-independence

When Tuvalu became independent in 1978, he was appointed as its first prime minister. He was also the minister of finance from 1977 to 1981.  He was appointed as a member of the Privy Council in 1979.

The first elections after independence were not held until 8 September 1981. At that election Dr. Tomasi Puapua, was elected as prime minister with a 7:5 majority over the group of members of parliament headed by Toaripi Lauti. The administration of Toaripi Lauti had become involved in controversy, as a result of his decision to invest nearly all of the government's money with an American real estate salesman who promised 15 percent returns from the purchase of land in Texas. The investment turned out to be a fraud. While the funds were recovered by US agencies, the controversy resulted in a loss of confidence in his judgment and was an important factor in the election of Dr. Tomasi Puapua.

Toaripi Lauti also served as the President of the Funafuti Town Council and as a member of the Tuvalu Language Board.

Governor-General of Tuvalu

His reputation was redeemed from the circumstances that ended his time as prime minister, he was the Governor-General of Tuvalu, representing Elizabeth II, Queen of Tuvalu as head of state, from 1 October 1990 through 1 December 1993. In 1990, he was appointed a Knight Grand Cross of the Order of St Michael and St George (GCMG).

References

1928 births
2014 deaths
Knights Grand Cross of the Order of St Michael and St George
Members of the Privy Council of the United Kingdom
Prime Ministers of Tuvalu
Finance Ministers of Tuvalu
Governors-General of Tuvalu
Gilbert and Ellice Islands people